Ecuador has competed in 12 Summer Olympic Games. They debuted in the Winter Olympic Games in 2018. The nation won its first medal when Jefferson Pérez won the gold medal in the men's 20 km walk at  the 1996 Olympic Games. The Ecuadorian National Olympic Committee was created in 1948 and recognized by the IOC in 1959.

The country made its Winter Olympics debut in 2018.

Medal tables

Medals by Summer Games

Medals by Winter Games

Medals by sport

List of medalists

Multiple medalists

See also
 List of flag bearers for Ecuador at the Olympics
 Ecuador at the Paralympics

References

External links